The former Union Stores Building is a heritage listed building located at 41-47 High Street on the corner with Henry Street in the Fremantle West End Heritage area.

Construction of the building commenced in 1895 for prominent local merchant John Wesley Bateman to house his growing hardware business.

Bateman's business had occupied a building at the corner of Mouat Street and Croke Street for the previous 25 years before he decided to build larger premises at the present address. The new building designed by architects, Davis and Wilson, was built at a cost of  £7,000 giving Bateman a more central location and more space.

Built in the Federation Free Classical style the two storey building was constructed from brick and stone. The tuck pointed brick facade contains extensive decorative detailing indicative of the original four stores street frontage. On the rood parapet there are alternating segmented arched and triangular pediments separated by stucco corinthian pilasters and featured urns. The corner feature of the facade is an ornate shell pediment. The widely arched windows are spaced alternately with triangular topped casements separated with decorative stucco architraves. The windows hold stained glass in the upper portion of the frame with regular glass panes below. The front of the building has tiled dado of patterned rectangular green and brown glazed tiles. Much of the facade has Queen Anne style architectural elements

The building has  frontage along High Street and a depth of  along Henry Street. It was opened to the public in September 1896 offering hardware, houseware and grocery lines.

In 1898 a fire started in W. J. Beisley's tobacco shop, on the ground floor of the Union Stores building causing about £200 of damage.

In 2014 the council had some exterior renovations completed on the building's facade and roof including removal of paint and concrete, restoring lime and mortar as well as street frontage maintenance.

See also
 List of heritage places in Fremantle

References

High Street, Fremantle
Henry Street, Fremantle
Heritage places in Fremantle
1895 establishments in Australia
State Register of Heritage Places in the City of Fremantle